My Little Marquise (French: Ma petite marquise) is a 1937 French comedy film directed by Robert Péguy and starring Josseline Gaël, Paul Pauley and Fernand Fabre.

Cast
  Jacotte  as La petite Jacotte  
 Josseline Gaël as Monique Cormier  
 Paul Pauley as Adolphe Cormier  
 André Bervil as Pierre Mareuil  
 Fernand Fabre as François Mareuil  
 François Rodon as Le petit Julien  
 Yvette Andréyor as La tante  
 Charlotte Clasis as Nounou  
 Jacques Derives as Antoine  
 Jean Brochard as Godard

References

Bibliography 
 Rège, Philippe. Encyclopedia of French Film Directors, Volume 1. Scarecrow Press, 2009.

External links 
 

1937 films
French comedy films
1937 comedy films
1930s French-language films
Films directed by Robert Péguy
French black-and-white films
1930s French films